The Middle Miocene is a sub-epoch of the Miocene Epoch made up of two stages: the Langhian and Serravallian stages. The Middle Miocene is preceded by the Early Miocene.

The sub-epoch lasted from 15.97 ± 0.05 Ma to 11.608 ± 0.005 Ma (million years ago).  During this period, a sharp drop in global temperatures took place. This event is known as the Middle Miocene Climate Transition.

For the purpose of establishing European Land Mammal Ages this sub-epoch is equivalent to the Astaracian age.

External links 
 GeoWhen Database - Middle Miocene

.02
 02